Isophorone diamine (usually shortened to IPDA) is a diamine with the formula (CH3)3C6H7(NH2)(CH2NH2). It is a colorless liquid.  It is a precursor to polymers and coatings.

Production
It is usually produced as a mixture of the cis- and trans-isomers. It is produced by hydrocyanation of isophorone followed by reductive amination and hydrogenation of the nitrile.

Uses
IPDA is used as a precursor in the manufacture of isophorone diisocyanate by phosgenation.

Like other diamines or amines in general, it is a curing agent for epoxy resins. When used in coatings applications the higher cost compared to other amines is justified by the enhanced UV stability and thus lower yellowing tendency. In the production of Advanced composite materials (engineering) its higher cost compared to other amines is less critical as performance is the key criteria. Cycloaliphatic amines such as IPDA also are known to have lower yellowing tendency than other amines and are thus used in coatings applications where this feature is important for aesthetics. Although it is not the only cycloaliphatic amine used in epoxy flooring, it has the largest use by volume. Other cycloaliphatic amines used in flooring include 1,3-BAC, MXDA, PACM and DCH-99.

That is at least twice as fast as other Direct Air Capture lab systems, and far faster than the leading artificial leaf device.

The pollutant separated out into flakes of a solid carbamic acid material, which could be removed from the liquid relatively easily. If need be, it can be converted back into gaseous  by heating it to 60 °C (140 °F), which also releases the original liquid IPDA ready for reuse. Whether the carbon is kept as a solid or a gas, it can then be stored or reused in industrial or chemical processes. The research was published in the journal ACS Environmental Au.

See also
 Epoxy
 1,3-BAC
 MXDA 
 PACM
 DCH-99

References

External links 
 
 Safety Data Sheet   
 BASF Product Data
 Technical Data Sheet
 Three Bond Epoxy article

Diamines
Cycloalkylamines